Oscar Greeley Clendenning Hammerstein II (July 12, 1895 – August 23, 1960) was an American lyricist, librettist, theatrical producer, and (usually uncredited) director in  musical theater for nearly 40 years. He won eight Tony Awards and two Academy Awards for Best Original Song. Many of his songs are standard repertoire for vocalists and jazz musicians. He co-wrote 850 songs.

He is best known for his collaborations with composer Richard Rodgers, as the duo Rodgers and Hammerstein, whose musicals include Oklahoma!, Carousel, South Pacific, The King and I, and The Sound of Music. Described by Stephen Sondheim as an "experimental playwright", Hammerstein helped bring the American musical to new maturity by popularizing musicals that focused on stories and character rather than the lighthearted entertainment that the musical had been known for beforehand.

He also collaborated with Jerome Kern (with whom he wrote Show Boat), Vincent Youmans, Rudolf Friml, Richard A. Whiting, and Sigmund Romberg.

Early life
Oscar Greeley Clendenning Hammerstein II was born in New York City, the son of Alice Hammerstein ( Nimmo) and theatrical manager William Hammerstein. His grandfather was the German theater impresario Oscar Hammerstein I. His father was from a Jewish family, and his mother was the daughter of British parents. He attended the Church of the Divine Paternity, now the Fourth Universalist Society in the City of New York.

Although Hammerstein's father managed the Victoria Theatre and was a producer of vaudeville shows, he was opposed to his son's desire to participate in the arts.

Hammerstein attended Columbia University (1912–1916) and studied at Columbia Law School until 1917. As a student, he maintained high grades and engaged in numerous extracurricular activities. These included playing first base on the baseball team, performing in the Varsity Show and becoming an active member of Pi Lambda Phi, a mostly Jewish fraternity.

After his father's death, in June 1914, when he was 19, he participated in his first play with the Varsity Show, entitled On Your Way. Throughout the rest of his college career, Hammerstein wrote and performed in several Varsity Shows.

Early career
After quitting law school to pursue theater, Hammerstein began his first professional collaboration, with Herbert Stothart, Otto Harbach and Frank Mandel. He began as an apprentice and went on to form a 20-year collaboration with Harbach. Out of this collaboration came his first musical, Always You, for which he wrote the book and lyrics. It opened on Broadway in 1920. In 1921 Hammerstein joined The Lambs club.

Throughout the next forty years, Hammerstein teamed up with many other composers, including Jerome Kern, with whom Hammerstein enjoyed a highly successful collaboration. In 1927, Kern and Hammerstein wrote their biggest hit based on Edna Ferber's bestselling eponymous novel, Show Boat, which is often revived, as it is considered one of the masterpieces of American musical theater. "Here we come to a completely new genre—the musical play as distinguished from musical comedy. Now ... the play was the thing, and everything else was subservient to that play. Now ... came complete integration of song, humor and production numbers into a single and inextricable artistic entity." Many years later, Hammerstein's wife Dorothy bristled when she overheard someone remark that Jerome Kern had written "Ol' Man River". "Indeed not", she retorted. "Jerome Kern wrote 'dum, dum, dum-dum'. My husband wrote 'Ol' Man River'."

Other Kern–Hammerstein musicals include Sunny, Sweet Adeline, Music in the Air, Three Sisters, and Very Warm for May. Hammerstein also collaborated with Vincent Youmans (Wildflower), Rudolf Friml (Rose-Marie), and Sigmund Romberg (The Desert Song and The New Moon).

Rodgers and Hammerstein

Hammerstein's most successful and sustained collaboration began when he teamed up with Richard Rodgers to write a musical adaptation of the play Green Grow the Lilacs. Rodgers' first partner, Lorenz Hart, originally planned to collaborate with Rodgers on this piece, but his alcoholism had spiraled out of control, rendering him incapacitated. Hart was also not certain that the idea had much merit, and the two therefore separated. The adaptation became the first Rodgers and Hammerstein collaboration, entitled Oklahoma!, which opened on Broadway in 1943. It furthered the revolution begun by Show Boat, by thoroughly integrating all the aspects of musical theater, with the songs and dances arising out of and further developing the plot and characters.

William A. Everett and Paul R. Laird wrote that this was a "show, that, like Show Boat, became a milestone, such that subsequent historians writing about important moments in twentieth-century theater began to identify eras according to their relationship to Oklahoma!" After Oklahoma!, Rodgers and Hammerstein were the most important contributors to the musical-play form—with such masterworks as Carousel, The King and I and South Pacific. "The examples they set in creating vital plays, often rich with social thought, provided the necessary encouragement for other gifted writers to create musical plays of their own".

The partnership went on to produce not only the aforementioned, but also other Broadway musicals such as Allegro, Me and Juliet, Pipe Dream, Flower Drum Song, and The Sound of Music, as well as the musical film State Fair (and its stage adaptation of the same name), and the television musical Cinderella, all featured in the revue A Grand Night for Singing. Hammerstein also wrote the book and lyrics for Carmen Jones, an adaptation of Georges Bizet's opera Carmen, with an all-black cast that became a 1943 Broadway musical and a 1954 film, starring Dorothy Dandridge.

Advocacy
An active advocate for writers' rights within the theater industry, Hammerstein was a member of the Dramatists Guild of America. In 1956, he was elected as the eleventh president of the nonprofit organization. He continued his presidency at the Guild until 1960; he was succeeded by Alan Jay Lerner.

Personal life

Hammerstein married his first wife, Myra Finn, in 1917; the couple divorced in 1929. He married his second wife, the Australian-born Dorothy (Blanchard) Jacobson (1899–1987), in 1929. He had three children: William Hammerstein (1918–2001) and Alice Hammerstein Mathias (1922–2015) by his first wife, and James Hammerstein (1931–1999) by his second wife, with whom he also had a stepson, Henry Jacobson, and a stepdaughter, Susan Blanchard.

Oscar Hammerstein died of stomach cancer on August 23, 1960, at his home Highland Farm in Doylestown, Pennsylvania, aged 65, nine months after the opening of The Sound of Music on Broadway. The final song he wrote was "Edelweiss", which was added near the end of the second act during rehearsal. The lights of Times Square were turned off for one minute, and London's West End lights were dimmed in recognition of his contribution to the musical. He was cremated, and his ashes were buried at the Ferncliff Cemetery in Hartsdale, New York. A memorial plaque was unveiled at Southwark Cathedral, England, on May 24, 1961.

After Hammerstein's death, The Sound of Music was adapted as a 1965 film, which won the Academy Award for Best Picture.

Reputation
Hammerstein was one of the most important "book writers" in Broadway history—he made the story, not the songs or the stars, central to the musical and brought musical theater to full maturity as an art form. According to Stephen Sondheim, "What few people understand is that Oscar's big contribution to the theater was as a theoretician, as a Peter Brook, as an innovator. People don't understand how experimental Show Boat and Oklahoma! felt at the time they were done. Oscar is not about the 'lark that is learning to pray'—that's easy to make fun of. He's about Allegro", Hammerstein's most experimental musical.

His reputation for being sentimental is based largely on the movie versions of the musicals, especially The Sound of Music, in which a song sung by those in favor of reaching an accommodation with the Nazis, "No Way to Stop It", was cut. As recent revivals of Show Boat, Oklahoma!, Carousel, and The King and I in London and New York show, Hammerstein was one of the more tough-minded and socially conscious American musical theater artists. According to Richard Kislan, "The shows of Rodgers and Hammerstein were the product of sincerity. In the light of criticism directed against them and their universe of sweetness and light, it is important to understand that they believed sincerely in what they wrote." According to Marc Bauch, "The Rodgers and Hammerstein musicals are romantic musical plays. Love is important."

According to The Rodgers and Hammerstein Story by Stanley Green, "For three minutes, on the night of September first, the entire Times Square area in New York City was blacked out in honor of the man who had done so much to light up that particular part of the world. From 8:57 to 9:00 p.m., every neon sign and every light bulb was turned off and all traffic was halted between 42nd Street and 53rd Street, and between eighth Ave and the Avenue of the Americas. A crowd of 5,000 people, many with heads bowed, assembled at the base of the statue of Father Duffy on Times Square where two trumpeters blew taps. It was the most complete blackout on Broadway since World War II, and the greatest tribute of its kind ever paid to one man."

Songs
According to The Complete Lyrics of Oscar Hammerstein II, edited by Amy Asch, Hammerstein contributed the lyrics to 850 songs, including "Ol' Man River", "Can't Help Lovin' That Man" and "Make Believe" from Show Boat; "Indian Love Call" from Rose-Marie; "People Will Say We're in Love" and "Oklahoma" (which has been the official state song of Oklahoma since 1953) from Oklahoma!; "Some Enchanted Evening", from South Pacific; "Getting to Know You" and "Shall We Dance" from The King and I; and the title song as well as "Climb Ev'ry Mountain" from The Sound of Music.

Several albums of Hammerstein's musicals were named to the "Songs of the Century" list as compiled by the Recording Industry Association of America (RIAA), the National Endowment for the Arts, and Scholastic Corporation:
The Sound of Music — # 36
Oklahoma! — # 66
South Pacific — # 224
The King and I — # 249
Show Boat — # 312

Awards and nominations
Hammerstein won two Oscars for best original song—in 1941 for "The Last Time I Saw Paris" in the film Lady Be Good, and in 1945 for "It Might as Well Be Spring" in State Fair. In 1950, the team of Rodgers and Hammerstein received The Hundred Year Association of New York's Gold Medal Award "in recognition of outstanding contributions to the City of New York."

Hammerstein won eight Tony Awards, six for lyrics or book, and two as producer of the Best Musical (South Pacific and The Sound of Music). Rodgers and Hammerstein began writing together before the era of the Tonys: Oklahoma! opened in 1943 and Carousel in 1945, and the Tony Awards were not awarded until 1947. They won a special Pulitzer Prize in 1944 for Oklahoma! and, with Joshua Logan, the annual Pulitzer Prize for Drama in 1950 for South Pacific. The Oscar Hammerstein II Center for Theater Studies at Columbia University was established in 1981 with a $1 million gift from his family.

Legacy 
His advice and work influenced Stephen Sondheim, a friend of the Hammerstein family from childhood. Sondheim has attributed his success in theater, and especially as a lyricist, directly to Hammerstein's influence and guidance.

The Oscar Hammerstein Award for Lifetime Achievement in Musical Theater is presented annually. The York Theatre Company of New York City is the administrator of the award. Past awardees are composers such as Stephen Sondheim and performers such as Carol Channing.

Oscar Hammerstein was a member of the American Theater Hall of Fame.

References

Further reading

External links

 
 
 
 Musicals by Rodgers and Hammerstein
 Biography of Oscar Hammerstein II at RNH Official Site
 Oscar Hammerstein II interviewed by Mike Wallace on The Mike Wallace Interview March 15, 1958
 Oscar Hammerstein II Collection at the Library of Congress
 
 Oscar Hammerstein II recordings at the Discography of American Historical Recordings.

 
1895 births
1960 deaths
20th-century American dramatists and playwrights
American Episcopalians
American musical theatre librettists
American musical theatre lyricists
American people of English descent
American people of German-Jewish descent
American people of Scottish descent
American theatre managers and producers
Broadway composers and lyricists
Broadway theatre producers
Best Original Song Academy Award-winning songwriters
Burials at Ferncliff Cemetery
Columbia College (New York) alumni
Columbia Law School alumni
Deaths from cancer in Pennsylvania
Deaths from stomach cancer
Grammy Award winners
Hammerstein family (show business)
Jewish American songwriters
Pulitzer Prize for Drama winners
Pulitzer Prize winners
Songwriters from New York (state)
Tony Award winners
Members of the American Academy of Arts and Letters